Squegging is a radio engineering term. It is a contraction of self-quenching. A squegging or self-blocking oscillator produces an intermittent or changing output signal. Wildlife tags for birds and little mammals use squegging oscillators. The Armstrong super-regenerative radio receiver uses a self-blocking oscillator, too. The receiver sensitivity rises while the oscillation builds up. The oscillation stops when the operation point no longer fulfills the Barkhausen stability criterion. The blocking oscillator recovers to the initial state and the cycle starts again.
The receive frequency of the Armstrong Super-Regenerative receiver was some hundred kilohertz. The self-quenching frequency was ten kilohertz, just above the highest audio frequency the headphone could reproduce.

Squegging is an oscillation that builds up and dies down with a much longer time constant than the fundamental frequency of the oscillation. A self-quenching oscillator circuit oscillates at two or more frequencies at the same time.

Unwanted squegging
In an audio amplifier, all forms of oscillation are generally unwanted.  Poor design and layout can sometimes lead to squegging in such an amplifier.  As always, this arises from a combination of high and low frequency oscillations.   Poor layout or poor shielding leads to high-frequency oscillations where the output has been coupled back to the input, especially if the input and output cables are run together for a distance.   The high-frequency oscillations cause heavy currents in the output stages and, with poor power supply decoupling, these upset the input stage biasing and disrupt the high frequency oscillations.  Squegging then arises. Squegging in audio amplifiers is commonly called motorboating because it sounds in the loudspeaker like an outboard boat motor at low speed. A series resistor or a ferrite bead close to the gate or base connector of the active element reduces high frequency oscillations.

Patents

See also
 AI Mk. IV radar

References

Oscillation